The Archdiocese of Hobart is a Latin Church ecclesiastical territory or archdiocese of the Catholic Church in Australia located in Hobart and covering Tasmania, Australia.

Immediately exempt to the Holy See, the area covered was initially administered by the Vicariate Apostolic of New Holland and Van Diemen's Land. In 1842, the Vicariate Apostolic of Hobart was erected; elevated as a diocese a few weeks later; and as an archdiocese in 1888.

St Mary's Cathedral is the seat of the Catholic Archbishop of Hobart, currently Julian Porteous.

History
Established 5 April 1842 as the Vicariate Apostolic of Hobart and became Diocese of Hobart on 22 April 1842.
On 3 August 1888 as the Archdiocese of Hobart.

Bishops
The following individuals have been appointed as Bishops of Hobart or any of its precursor titles:

The above table also includes coadjutors, all of whom later served in this see.  There was another coadjutor, with appointment not taking effect: Thomas Butler † , appointed Coadjutor Bishop on 13 Mar 1860.

Other priests of this diocese who became bishops
Anthony Joseph Burgess †, appointed Coadjutor Bishop of Wewak, Papua New Guinea in 2000
Geoffrey Hylton Jarrett, appointed Coadjutor Bishop of Lismore in 2000

Cathedral
St Mary's Cathedral, Hobart is the cathedral for the Roman Catholic Archdiocese of Hobart.

Parishes

Southern Tasmania

Northern Tasmania

North Western Tasmania

Controversy

In 2007 Gregory Ferguson, a Marist priest, was sentenced to two years jail (eligible for parole after 12 months) for offences in 1971 against two boys aged 13 at Marist College, Burnie, Tasmania. On 13 December 2007 he was sentenced to an additional three years' jail for offences against a third boy.

While in 2008, a jury found former priest Roger Michael Bellemore guilty on three counts of maintaining a sexual relationship with a young person under the age of 17 years in the 1960s and 1970s, while he was at the same College.

In 2015, Archbishop Julian Porteous was notified that a complaint had been filed with the office of Tasmania's Anti-discrimination Commissioner in relation to the distribution in all Tasmanian Catholic schools of a booklet, Don't Mess with Marriage, stating marriage should be a "heterosexual union between a man and a woman" and changing the law would endanger a child's upbringing. The complaint was filed by a transgender activist and Federal Greens candidate Martine Delaney. The complaint was called "'an attempt to silence' the Church over same-sex marriage" by Archbishop Porteous. The complaint was treated as a possible breach of the Anti-Discrimination Act 1998 (Tas), and sparked fierce debate on the issues of freedom of religion, freedom of expression, and tolerance. The complaint was ultimately withdrawn.

It has been reported that, "The real problem with the Porteous case was that it was unresolved".

See also

 Roman Catholicism in Australia

References

External links
Catholic Archdiocese of Hobart

 
Hobart
Hobart
Hobart, Roman Catholic Archdiocese of
Hobart